Third Conference of the Non-Aligned Movement on 8–10 September 1970 in Lusaka, Zambia was the third conference of the Non-Aligned Movement. A preparatory meeting of Foreign Ministers drafted a number of resolutions which were considered by the Summit Conference. President of Zambia Kenneth Kaunda opened the conference by underlining non-alignment as "the natural choice at the time of increased hostility created by ideological conflicts in the bipolar world"

The conference was organized in the context of the development of the policy of Détente which in fact led to relaxing tensions between the Soviet Union and the West, yet this increased cooperation among superpowers potentially excluded the space for the initiative of Third World countries. It was organized 6 years after the conference in Cairo what was the longest period between the two conferences. The location for the conference was in part selected in order to support Zambia whose sovereignty and borders were threatened by Rhodesia and Apartheid era South Africa.

The conference adopted, the "Declaration on Peace, Independence, Development, Cooperation and Democrtization of International Relations" and  the "Declaration on Non-Alignment and Economic Development". It also adopted as a number of resolutions on the UN and the Non-Alignment (reaffirming the commitment to the world organization), Seabed usage (peaceful and scientific usage), Disarmament (nuclear dissarmament), Middle East situation (call to Israeli withdrawal from the occupied territories), Agression on Lebanon (condemnation of the Israeli intervention and call for UN action), the Arrest of Algerians in Israel (call for release from prison), Strengthening the Role of the Non-Aligned Movement (establishment of the executive mechanism),  Southeast Asia Situation (concern over US involvement), Decolonization (call on France and Spain to complete the process and call for new measures on Portugal, South Africa and Rhodesia), Racial discrimination (South Africa situation), Portugal colonies, on Zimbabwe and on Namibia. Yugoslavia was in part dissatisfied with strong focus of African issues which prevented further discussion on issues in Latin America and Europe.

The conference was commended by the Premier of the Soviet Union Alexei Kosygin, Premier of the People's Republic of China Zhou Enlai, Chancellor of Germany Willy Brandt, Chairman of the State Council of East Germany Walter Ulbricht, Pope Paul VI, President of the State Council of Romania Nicolae Ceaușescu and others.

Preparation for the Conference
15 Non-Aligned countries met in Belgrade in March 1965 to coordinate their response to the Vietnam War. At the time, developing countries were divided between the supporters of what was known as the regionalist concept (Afro-Asian People's Solidarity Organisation supported at the time by China) and universalist concept (Non-Aligned Movement). The Non-Aligned concept in the end was more successful in part due to coincidence that the 1965 Afro-Asian conference in Algeria was canceled due to 1965 Algerian coup d'état. In 1966 President of Yugoslavia Josip Broz Tito, President of Egypt Gamal Abdel Nasser and Prime Minister of India Indira Gandhi met in New Delhi where they called for more Non-Aligned solidarity. The initiative to organize the third NAM conference to follow the 1964 conference in Cairo was formed by the Federal Secretariat of Foreign Affairs of Yugoslavia on 9 May 1968 when the institution published the "Draft Thesis for the Platform of the Conference of Non-Aligned and Peaceful Countries". Zambia was one of the countries which supported the idea to organize the event. To promote the idea, President Tito visited 11 countries in early 1968 including prominent Non-Aligned members such as India, Egypt and Ethiopia. Request by the Francoist Spain to the Yugoslav representation in Paris to get involved in the movement was perceived as unexpected, but was nevertheless shared with Ethiopia and India (both of which were initially considered for hosting the event) and was ultimately rejected as inappropriate due to Spanish support to Portuguese colonialism. Ethiopia and Yugoslavia were strongly motivated to initiate the event to voice concerns of small states after the August 1968 Warsaw Pact invasion of Czechoslovakia, therefore Yugoslav Delegation to the United Nations hosted the NAM foreign ministers (59 out of 74 invited attended) at the margins of the Twenty-seventh session of the United Nations General Assembly. At the meeting in Dar es Salaam countries formally interested in hosting the event were Ethiopia, India, Morocco and Algeria. Arab countries pressured Ethiopia to drop its application, after which Addis Ababa strongly advocated for Zambia which received 29, while Algeria received 23 votes.

The meeting in Dar es Salaam was followed by the Preparatory Meeting for the Third Conference by the NAM Permanent Committee was held in New Delhi, India between 7 and 9 June 1970. Delegates of 16 member states of the NAM Permanent Committee at the time were Algeria, Burundi, Ceylon, Ethiopia, Guyana, India, Indonesia, Iraq, Yugoslavia, Malaysia, Morocco, Senegal, Sudan, Tanzania, United Arab Republic and Zambia. The Committee confirmed Zambia as the host the conference and invited member states with delegations in Lusaka to provide help needed in the preparation of the event.

Socialist Federal Republic of Yugoslavia (host of the first conference) provided significant support to Zambia in organization of the conference. Only four months before the event President of Zambia (reluctant to invite companies from Western Bloc) invited Belgrade based construction company Energoprojekt holding asking them to build 4,000-seat convention hall as fast as possible. The project was designed and built simultaneously and 115 days after the works started and two weeks ahead of the deadline, the new convention hall was ready for the event.

Participants
The following states participated at the Conference in Lusaka;

Member states

 
 
 
 
 
 
 
 
 
 
 
 
  Equatorial Guinea

Observers

 
 
 
 
 
 
 
 
 
 Afro-Asian People's Solidarity Organisation
 Organisation of African Unity
 Provisional Revolutionary Government of the Republic of South Vietnam

Guests
 People's Movement for the Liberation of Angola
 South West Africa People’s Organisation
 Zimbabwe African National Union
 Zimbabwe African People's Union
 Mozambique Liberation Front
 African National Congress of South Africa
 National Movement for the Liberation of the Comoros Islands
 Front de Libération de la Côte des Somalis
 Palestine Liberation Organisation
 There were 2  rival Cambodian delegations, one representing the Government of General Lon Nol, and the other representing the deposed Prince Norodom Sihanouk.

See also
 Foreign relations of Zambia

References

Summit 3rd
Foreign relations of Zambia
Lusaka
1970 conferences
1970 in politics
1970 in Zambia